Karl Ritter may refer to:

 Karl Ritter (diplomat) (1883–1968), German diplomat
 Karl Ritter (director) (1888–1977), German film producer and director
 Carl Ritter (1779–1859), German geographer
 Karl Wilhelm Ritter (1847–1906), civil engineer and rector of the Polytechnic Institute of Zurich